The Secretary of Defense Employer Support Freedom Award is the highest recognition given by the U.S. Government to employers for their support of their employees who serve in the National Guard and Reserve. To be eligible for the award, an employer must be nominated by one of its Guard or Reserve employees, or a family member of that employee.

The Freedom Award was instituted in 1996 by then-Secretary of Defense William Perry under the auspices of the National Committee for Employer Support of the Guard and Reserve (ESGR). ESGR is a Department of Defense agency established in 1972 whose mission, according to its website, is to "gain and maintain employer support for Guard and Reserve service by recognizing outstanding support, increasing awareness of the law, and resolving conflicts through mediation." The award was created to recognize the ways the nation's employers support their Guard and Reserve employees, and is the highest in a series of ESGR awards that include the Patriot Award, the Above and Beyond Award, and the Pro Patria Award.

A senior Defense Department official presents the awards at a dinner ceremony in Washington, DC; past presenters have included the Secretary of Defense, the Under Secretary of Defense for Personnel and Readiness, the Army Vice Chief of Staff, and the Vice Chairman of the Joint Chiefs of Staff. Since 1996, over 100 employers have received the Freedom Award.

Freedom Award website 
In 2008, ESGR launched a website for the Freedom Award. Using videos, news articles, profiles of recipients, and tips about employer best practices, the site provides information about the support that employers across the nation provide to their Guard and Reserve employees and their families. The site also houses the nomination form for the award.

Recipients

2012 
Basin Electric Power Cooperative
Caterpillar Inc.
Citi
Crystal Springs United Methodist Church
Delta Air Lines
Gary Jet Center
iostudio
Kalamazoo Department of Public Safety
L-3 Communications
Nyemaster Goode
Port of Seattle
Siemens Corporation
Tennessee Valley Authority
Uniform Color Company
Verizon Wireless

2011 
3M Company
Ameren Corporation
Burt County Sheriff's Office
CSX Transportation
Electrical Contractors Inc.
Ford Motor Company
Hanson Professional Services Inc.
Integrity Applications Incorporated
Orange County Sheriff's Department
The Principal Financial Group
Qwest Communications, now CenturyLink, Inc.
St. John's Lutheran Church
State Employees' Credit Union
Town of Gilbert
Wells Fargo & Company

2010 
Bill Bragg Plumbing
City of Irvine Police Department
Dollar General Corporation
East Carolina University
Food Lion
Franklin's Printing
Intuit Inc.
Legacy Sports International
Logistics Health Inc
MERCK
Michigan State Police
Newmont Mining Corporation
Southern Company
State of Hawaii
Yerecic Label

2009 
Aerodyn Wind Tunnel LLC
AstraZeneca Pharmaceuticals
Cambridge Fire Department
Consolidated Electrical Distributors, Inc.
First Data Corporation
FMC Technologies
Jackson Parish Sheriff's Department
Marks, O'Neill, O'Brien & Courtney
Microsoft Corporation
Mid America Kidney Stone Association
NetJets
Ohio Department of Public Safety
Perpetual Technologies, Inc.
Santa Ana Police Department
TriWest Healthcare Alliance

2008 
Choctaw Nation of Oklahoma
Chrysler LLC
City of Austin, Texas
Coastal Windows, Inc.
Dominion Resources Inc.
Jersey City Fire Department
Lochinvar Corporation
Oakland County Sheriff’s Office
Oshkosh Corporation
Regional Emergency Medical Services Authority
Robinson Transport, Inc.
State Farm Mutual Automobile Insurance Company
Union Pacific Corporation
Winner School District
Womble Carlyle Sandridge & Rice, PLLC

2007 
Augustine and Sons, Inc.
CHE Consulting, Inc.
Con-way, Inc.
Creative Healthcare Solutions, Inc.
Dollar Thrifty Automotive Group, Inc.
Ganntt's Excavating and Contracting, Inc.
General Motors Corporation
The New Hampshire State Police
Nucor Corporation
Sierra Pacific Resources
Sodexho USA
The State of Tennessee
Turbocam International
Ultra Machining Company, Inc.
Wilmington, VA Medical Center

2006 

AgCountry Farm Credit Services
Allianz Life Insurance Company of North America
Baptist Health
BNSF Railway Company
Cardi's Furniture Superstores
Commonwealth of Massachusetts
Computer Sciences Corporation
DuPont
Fred Fletemeyer Company
MGM Mirage
Skyline Membership Corporation
South Dakota Game, Fish and Parks
Starbucks Corporation
State of Vermont
Sun Valley General Improvement District

2005 
Alticor, Inc.
Citizens Financial Group
Eaton Corporation
Enterprise Rent-a-Car
IDACORP
Los Angeles Police Department
Louisiana Department of Public Safety & Corrections
Pioneer Financial Services, Inc.
Ryland Homes
Sears, Roebuck and Company
South Dakota State University
State of Delaware
Toyota Motor Sales, U.S.A., Inc.
USAA
Wachovia Corporation

2004 
Adolph Coors Company
American Express Company
Bank One Corporation
Colt Fire Safety and Rescue
General Electric Company
Harley-Davidson, Inc.
The Home Depot
Los Angeles County Sheriff’s Department
State of Minnesota
Northrop Grumman Corporation
One Source Building Technologies
Saints Memorial Medical Center
Sprint Corporation
Strategic Solutions, Inc.
Wal-Mart Stores, Inc.

2003 
Central Atlantic Toyota Distribution Center
D.H. Griffin Wrecking Co.
Miller Brewing Company
PG&E Corporation
Tyson Foods, Inc.

2002 
Autoliv, Inc.
General Dynamics Corporation
Public Service Company of New Hampshire
State of Wyoming
United Parcel Service Airlines

2001 
BAE Systems
The Boeing Company
The City of Bedford, Virginia
Electronic Data Systems
Southwest Airlines, Inc.

2000 
American Express
Framatome Connectors USA
Intel Corporation
Midwest Express Airlines
Technology Concepts and Design

1999 
British Nuclear Fuels Limited, Inc.
General Fire and Safety Equipment Company, Inc.
Hitchiner Manufacturing Co., Inc.
Kaiser Permanente, Northwest
The State of Louisiana

1998 
American Airlines
American Family Mutual Insurance Company
CSX Transportation, Inc.
Portland Police Bureau
Wiremold Company

1997 
Charles Machine Works, Inc.
East Penn Manufacturing Co.
Entec Services, Inc.
Fred Meyer, Inc.
The Home Depot, Southeastern Division

1996 
McDonnell Douglas
National Life of Vermont
Schneider National
Tektronix, Inc.
United Parcel Service, Central Florida District

Sources 
This article contains information from a U.S. Government website in the public domain.

References

 Employer Support of the Guard and Reserve > Home

External links 
2012 recipients list
Freedom Award website
Freedom Award nomination form
White House photo of 2008 recipients in the Oval Office with President Bush
Human Events Online article on 2008 dinner ceremony

Awards and decorations of the United States Department of Defense